2010 is the second year of participation to the Championship for the TO. The team loses few players with Damien Couturier, Matthieu Almarcha, Jean-Christophe Borlin and Olivier Pramil leaving. On the other hand, they keep Yoan Tisseyre and Carlos Mendes Varela arrived in the summer 2009 and who played few games last season. They also sign Simon Worrall from the Leeds Rhinos on loan for one year and Vincent Duport from the Catalans Dragons. They also welcome Romain Mencarini from the UTC (Catalans Dragons reserve team in the French Championship).

Table

Fixtures and results

Match Reports

Co-operative Championship Round 1: vs. Dewsbury

Toulouse Kick Start the season!

In a perfect start to the season Rory Bromley bagged a brace of tries for Toulouse in their 26–22 Co-operative Championship win over the Dewsbury Rams.
Vincent Duport, Johan Tisseyre and Sebastien Planas all scored against the West Yorkshire outfit and Olympique came from 22 to 14 down to clinch the victory.
Scott Turner scored two second-half tries for the hapless Rams, but these could do nothing to alter the overall result.

Co-operative Championship Round 2: vs. Whitehaven

Toulouse squander their lead

Whitehaven opened their Co-operative Championship campaign with a 34–20 victory over Toulouse at the Recreation Ground in Cumbria.
Toulouse Olympique held an impressive 20–10 lead at the break, but let it slip away thanks to tries from a transformed Whitehaven outfit.
Dylan Skee and Carl Rudd crossed for the home side in the first half, Whitehaven then hit back after the break with tries from Carl Sice (2), Reece Fox and Ian Mort. Carl Rudd kicked 5 conversions for the home team.
Toulouse tries came from Rory Bromley, Antoni Maria, Bruno Ormeno and Julien Lasserre and four points from the boot of Nathan Wynn.

Co-operative Championship Round 3: vs. Keighley

Olympique beat the Cougars

Toulouse outscored Keighley by six tries to five in a 34–26 Co-operative Championship victory in Toulouse, France.
Cedric Gay scored two times for Olympique while Clement Bienes, Rory Bromley, Sebastien Planas and Kevin Larroyer all crossed the try line for a try apiece.
To add to this display of teamwork Nathan Wynn kicked five goals.
The Cougars came back with a strong second half display, tries came from Danny Jones (1), Oliver Pursglove(1), Gavin Duffy (1), Chris Baines (1) and James Feather (1), but walked away as the losers

Co-operative Championship Round 4: vs. Barrow

Disappointment for Toulouse in Raiders victory

A second-half hat-trick of tries from substitute Liam Campbell helped defending champions Barrow Raiders to a 48–16 win over Toulouse.
Olympique were level at 16–16 at half-time thanks to tries from Antoni Maria, Cedric Gay and Kevin Larroyer and two goals from Nathan Wynn in response to Raiders touchdowns from Matt James, Andrew Henderson and Zeb Luisi.
However, the visitors cut loose in the second half, scrum half Campbell scoring a 16-minute treble and other tries coming from Liam Harrison, Anthony Blackwood and Andy Ballard, while Jamie Rooney took his goal tally to six from nine attempts.

Co-operative Championship Round 5: vs. Leigh

Big loss for Olympique

The fans left disappointed, the Super League hopefuls showed little of the form that has earned them impressive victories earlier in the season.
Leigh followed up their 48–10 win at Halifax with a 36–6 victory over Toulouse in the south of France to stay just a point behind Featherstone in the Co-operative Championship table.
Even without Tyrone McCarthy, Lee Mitchell and Matty Blythe, who were all recalled by Warrington, the Centurions had little trouble collecting a fourth successive win.
Macgraff Leuluai, Dave McConnell, David Armitstead, Nicky Stanton, Stuart Donlan and Adam Higson scored the visitors' tries and Mick Nanyn kicked all six conversions.
Substitute Patellsio Pelo scored a consolation try for Toulouse just before the end.

Co-operative Championship Round 6: vs. Halifax

Halifax trounce Toulouse

Halifax overpowered Toulouse Olympique 50–6 in the Cooperative Championship game at The Shay.
Halifax's Shad Royston claimed a hat-trick; Lee Paterson and James Haley also grabbed doubles and Rob Worrincy and Frank Watene also touched down for the West Yorkshire side.
Paterson added seven goals for 'Fax while the French side's solitary try came from Rory Bromley.

Co-operative Championship Round 7: vs. Widnes

Stunning result for Toulouse

Toulouse claimed Widnes' scalp as they ran out 42–36 winners in an enjoyable Co-operative Championship encounter at the Stobart Stadium on Saturday. Widnes had a late surge in the closing stages with Anthony Thackeray scoring a hat-trick in the final 20 minutes alone.
But the French side had done enough in the first hour with tries from Mathieu Griffi, Vincent Duport (two), Nathan Wynn (two) and Sebastien Payan sealing success.

Carnegie Challenge Cup Round 4: vs. St Helens 

Toulouse knocked out of Challenge Cup

Toulouse made a spirited and enthusiastic challenge but where eventually overcome by the favourites from the Engage Super League.
The Icelandic volcanic cloud meant the Toulouse had to endure a 24-hour coach and ferry journey to St Helens.
Toulouse playing some slick football in the first half to initially shock the Saints and showed no sign of travel fatigue when they took the lead in their first set, with the bounce of the ball bamboozling Leon Pryce to allow centre Vincent Duport to collect and score.
The teams were very close for much of the first half before Flannery raced through for the try that effectively killed off the French resistance two minutes before the break
After the break St Helens piled on the tries before the unstoppable Fa'asavalu charged over for his second, to bring up the half-century as the Frenchmen tired. Toulouse grabbed a late consolation try when Martin Mitchell barged over.

Saints assistant coach Kieron Purtill paid tribute to the travel-weary French side; "They played some nice football, they have some internationals in there. They will ruffle a few feathers in the Championship and put a package together to apply for Super League so we knew what they were capable of."

Co-operative Championship Round 9: vs. Batley

Back into winning ways

Carlos Mendes Varela crossed for two first-half tries to rouse Toulouse to a 20–12 victory over Batley on Saturday night.

Mendes Varela touched down twice just before the interval, with Nathan Wynn converting on both occasions to ensure Toulouse held a 14–4 half-time lead.

After the break the Bulldogs closed the gap to just two points, Mark Toohey and Kris Lythe scored a try each but neither was converted.

Toulouse held on though and Mathieu Griffi's converted try nine minutes from the end preserved the victory.

Co-operative Championship Round 8: vs. Featherstone

Toulouse smash Rovers' unbeaten run

Toulouse rallied from a 14-point deficit in the second half to win 26–24 and condemn Featherstone to their first loss in the 2010 Co-operative Championship season.

Featherstone had looked on course for a ninth consecutive victory when Zak Hardaker's second try of the night was converted by Kyle Briggs resulting in a 24–10 lead after 46 minutes.

The French side fought back with tries from Martin Mitchell and Rory Bromley. Vincent Duport levelled the scores with barely three minutes remaining and Nathan Wynn held his nerve to kick the winning points and seal an unforgettable win.

Co-operative Championship Round 10: vs. Sheffield

Cook claims hat-trick for Eagles

Craig Cook scored a second-half hat-trick as Sheffield Eagles overcome Toulouse 38–24 in the Co-operative Championship.

Sheffield led 16–12 at half-time after tries from Tangi Ropati, Aaron Groom and Richie Barnett, with Sylvain Houles and Vincent Duport replying for Toulouse.

Alex Rowe scored for Sheffield before Craig Cook his scored his second half hat trick, Toulouse scored through Rory Bromley and Mathieu Griffi.

2010 Transfers
Transfers for 2010 (In)

Transfers for 2010 (Out)

2010 squad

 Sources : www.championshipstats.rlfans.com, to13.com, as of January 2010.

References

External links
 Toulouse Olympique official website (in French)
 Toulouse Olympique official website (in English)

Toulouse Olympique season
Toulouse Olympique
2010 in French rugby league
French rugby league club seasons